Jacob Cohen (April 20, 1923 – January 20, 1998) was an American psychologist and statistician best known for his work on statistical power and effect size, which helped to lay foundations for current statistical meta-analysis and the methods of estimation statistics. He gave his name to such measures as Cohen's kappa, Cohen's d, and Cohen's h.

Power analysis and significance testing 
In addition to being an advocate of power analysis and effect size, Cohen was a critic of reliance on, and lack of understanding of, significance testing procedures used in statistics, especially misunderstandings of null hypothesis significance testing. In particular, he identified the "near universal misinterpretation of p as the probability that H0 is false, the misinterpretation that its complement is the probability of successful replication, and the mistaken assumption that if one rejects H0 one thereby affirms the theory that led to the test". He encouraged instead a recognition of single studies as exploratory and a reliance on replication for support.

Career 

A graduate of City College, he received his PhD in clinical psychology at  New York University in 1950.
Between 1959 and retirement in 1993 he worked in the psychology department at New York University, latterly as the head of the quantitative psychology group.

He was awarded the Distinguished Lifetime Achievement Award by the American Psychological Association in 1997 and was a fellow of the American Association for the Advancement of Science, the American Psychological Association and the American Statistical Association.

Selected works
Below are listed some of Cohen's works. Where multiple authors are present, full names are used to facilitate reader searches for other works by those authors.

References

External links
 A Power Primer by Jacob Cohen

American statisticians
20th-century American psychologists
Jewish American scientists
1923 births
1998 deaths
20th-century American mathematicians
Fellows of the American Association for the Advancement of Science
Fellows of the American Statistical Association
20th-century American Jews
Quantitative psychologists